Thomas William Chilvers (3 February 1919 – 16 June 1990) was an Australian rugby league footballer who played in the 1940s.

Like many players of his era, Chilvers' rugby league career was interrupted by his Army service in World War II. 

In the early 1940s he was playing Reserve Grade with Eastern Suburbs. By 1945, he was stationed in Papua New Guinea with the AIF and survived the conflict.

After returning to Sydney in 1946, he joined the St. George Dragons and played two seasons with them, predominantly in Reserve Grade.

Chilvers died on 16 June 1990 in Padstow, New South Wales aged 71.

References

Australian Army personnel of World War II
1919 births
1990 deaths
Sydney Roosters players
St. George Dragons players
Rugby league hookers
Australian rugby league players
Rugby league players from Sydney
Australian Army soldiers